Lost and Found is a compilation album, and the third under the Buena Vista Social Club name, released on March 25, 2015 on World Circuit Records and Nonesuch Records. It is a mixture of leftover tracks from the Egrem studio sessions, and from a string of dates through the late 1990s and early 2000s, and live performances from the band in the years that followed.

Background
Following its release, the original Buena Vista Social Club album was an international best seller, and the most successful album in the history of Cuban music. The band was also profiled in the film of the same name, directed by Wim Wenders, in which the Cuban musicians travelled to Amsterdam and New York City as a full line-up, the latter performance was recorded in 1998 and released as a live album in 2008. This newfound attention allowed solo albums to be recorded by Ibrahim Ferrer, Eliades Ochoa, Manuel "Guajiro" Mirabal, Jesús "Aguaje" Ramos, Omara Portuondo, Rubén González and Cachaíto López. Orquesta Buena Vista Social Club, a core band featuring several of the original musicians, continued to sell out shows worldwide and embarked on a farewell "Adios" tour in 2015.

When asked about a possible album of leftover tracks from the Egrem studio sessions, producer Nick Gold said:

Track listing
All tracks produced by Nick Gold, except tracks 2 and 12, which are produced by Ry Cooder.

 "Bruca maniguá" – 5:16
 "Macusa" – 4:05
 "Tiene Sabor" – 3:18
 "Bodas de Oro" – 4:40
 "Black Chicken 37" – 3:33
 "Habanera" – 2:17
 "Como Fue" – 4:01
 "Guajira en F" – 4:21
 "Quiéreme Mucho" – 1:29
 "Pedacito de Papel" – 2:38
 "Mami Me Gustó" – 5:18
 "Lágrimas negras" – 4:05
 "Como Siento Yo" – 1:54
 Bonus Track: "Rubén Sings!" – 0:48

Personnel

 Ibrahim Ferrer, vocals (tracks 1, 7 and 11), coro (track 2)
 Demetrio Muñiz, band leader, trombone, coro (tracks 1, 7 and 11)
 Adolfo Pichardo, piano (tracks 1, 7 and 11)
 Orlando "Cachaíto" López, bass (tracks 1–5, 7, 8, 11 and 12)
 Angel Terry Domech, congas (tracks 1, 7 and 11)
 Filiberto Sánchez, timbales (tracks 1, 7 and 11)
 Roberto García, bongos (tracks 1, 7 and 11)
 Lázaro Villa, maracas, coro (tracks 1, 7 and 11)
 Manuel "Guajiro" Mirabal, trumpet (tracks 1, 4, 6–8 and 11), coro (tracks 1, 4, 7 and 11)
 Alejandro Pichardo, trumpet, coro (tracks 1, 4, 7, 8 and 11)
 Jesús "Aguaje" Ramos, trombone, coro (tracks 1, 4, 7, 8 and 11), band leader (tracks 4 and 8), trombone (tracks 4 and 8)
 Javier Zalba, alto, soprano saxophone (tracks 1, 7 and 11)
 Pantaleón Sánchez, alto sax (tracks 1, 7 and 11)
 Rafael "Jimmy" Jenks, tenor sax (tracks 1, 5, 7 and 11)
 Tony Jiménez, tenor sax (tracks 1, 7 and 11)
 Ventura Gutiérrez, baritone sax (tracks 1, 7 and 11)
 Eliades Ochoa, vocals, guitar (tracks 2, 9, 10 and 12)
 Compay Segundo, vocals, guitar (track 2)
 Juan de Marcos González, coro and conductor (track 2)
 Carlos González, bongos (tracks 2, 5 and 12), claves (track 3)
 Joachim Cooder, dumbek (tracks 2 and 12)
 Alberto "Virgilio" Valdés, maracas (tracks 2, 3, 5 and 12), coro (track 12)
 Omara Portuondo, vocals (tracks 3 and 12)
 Manuel Galbán, acoustic guitar (track 3), electric guitar (tracks 4 and 8)
 Swami Jr., seven-string guitar (track 3)
 Jorge Chicoy, electric guitar (track 3)
 Ramses M. González, drums (track 3)
 Amadito Valdés, timbales (tracks 3–5 and 8)
 Julián Corrales, violin (track 3)
 Enrique Lazaga, guiro (track 3, 4 and 8)
 Caridad Valdés Menéndez, Yaremi Alfonso Nápoles, Idania Valdés Casuso and Riena Hernández Centeno, coro (track 3)
 Rubén González, piano solo (track 4), piano (track 13)
 Rubencito González, piano (track 4)
 Miguel "Angá" Díaz, congas (tracks 4, 5 and 8)
 Carlitos González, bongos (tracks 4 and 8)
 Miguelito Valdés, trumpet solo (tracks 4 and 8)
 Luis Alemañy Conde, Yanko Pisaco and Yaure Muñiz, trumpet (tracks 4 and 8)
 Pedro Depestre, violin (track 5)
 Carlos M. Calunga, vocal (track 8)
 Roberto Fonseca, piano (track 8)
 Barbarito Torres, laúd (track 12)

Additional personnel

 Recorded and mixed by Jerry Boys
 Mastered by Tom Leader and Bernie Grundman
 Archive research and additional production by Tim Jenkinson
 Photography by Christien Jaspars and Karl Haimel
 Designed by House at Intro
 Sleeve notes by Nigel Williamson

Charts

Weekly charts

Year-end charts

References

2015 compilation albums
Buena Vista Social Club compilation albums
World Circuit (record label) compilation albums
Spanish-language compilation albums
Nonesuch Records compilation albums
Albums produced by Ry Cooder